Glaucocharis flavescens is a moth in the family Crambidae. It was described by David E. Gaskin in 1974. It is found on Sulawesi in Indonesia.

References

Diptychophorini
Moths described in 1974